The 2007–08 Biathlon World Cup – World Cup 4 was the fourth event of the season and was held in Oberhof, Germany, from January 3 until January 6, 2008.

Schedule of events

Medal winners

Men

Women

References

4
January 2008 sports events in Europe
World Cup - World Cup 4,2007-08
Sport in Oberhof, Germany
2008 in German sport
Sport in Thuringia
2007,Biathlon World Cup - World Cup 4